Hybolasius trigonellaris is a species of beetle in the family Cerambycidae. It was described by Hutton in 1898. It is known from New Zealand.

References

Hybolasius
Beetles described in 1898